John Matthews may refer to:

Politics
John Matthews (Australian politician) (1928–2019), New South Wales politician
John Matthews (physician) (1755–1826), physician and poet, MP for Herefordshire, 1803–1806
John Ernest Matthews (1840s-1930), British politician
John H. Matthews (known as Jack, 1888–1956), Canadian politician
John Matthews (South African politician), South African politician and Little Rivonia Trialist
John Matthews (Upper Canada politician) (died 1832), English-born politician in Upper Canada
John W. Matthews Jr. (born 1940), member of the South Carolina Senate

Sports
John Matthews (American football) (born 1986), American NFL wide-receiver
John Matthews (footballer) (born 1955), English Association footballer
John Matthews (English cricketer) (1847–1912), English cricketer
John Matthews (Scottish cricketer) (1921—2009), Scottish cricketer and physician
John Albert Mathews (born 1951), American Olympic rower
John Matthews (wrestler) (born 1951), American Olympic wrestler

Others
John Matthews (bishop) (1900–1978), Australian Anglican bishop
John Matthews (soda water manufacturer) (1808–1870), English American inventor
John A. Matthews, Montana Supreme Court judge
John C. Matthews, Union Army soldier and Medal of Honor recipient
John Hobson Matthews, Roman Catholic historian, archivist and solicitor
John Matthews (engineer), British agricultural engineer
John Matthews (historian), British historian
John and Caitlin Matthews (born 1948), British writer and mythologist with his wife Caitlin
John Matthews, artistically also known as Ricardo Autobahn (born 1978), British DJ, songwriter and musician

See also
John Mathews (disambiguation)
Jack Matthews (disambiguation)
John Mathew (disambiguation)